Brush Creek Township is one of the fourteen townships of Jefferson County, Ohio, United States.  The 2010 census found 438 people in the township.

Geography
Located in the northwestern corner of the county, it borders the following townships:
Washington Township, Columbiana County - north
Yellow Creek Township, Columbiana County - northeast
Saline Township - southeast
Ross Township - south
Springfield Township - southwest
Fox Township, Carroll County - northwest

No municipalities are located in Brush Creek Township.

Name and history
Brush Creek Township was organized in the 1830s. It was named from the Brush Creek which runs through it.

Statewide, other Brush Creek Townships are located in Adams, Muskingum, and Scioto counties, plus a Brushcreek Township in Highland County.

Government
The township is governed by a three-member board of trustees, who are elected in November of odd-numbered years to a four-year term beginning on the following January 1. Two are elected in the year after the presidential election and one is elected in the year before it. There is also an elected township fiscal officer, who serves a four-year term beginning on April 1 of the year after the election, which is held in November of the year before the presidential election. Vacancies in the fiscal officership or on the board of trustees are filled by the remaining trustees.

References

External links
County website

Townships in Jefferson County, Ohio
Townships in Ohio